"Wink" is a song written by Bob DiPiero and Tom Shapiro, and recorded by American country music singer Neal McCoy.  It was released in April 1994 as the second single from his album No Doubt About It.  Also the second consecutive Number One from that album, "Wink" spent four weeks at the top of the Billboard Hot Country Singles & Tracks (now Hot Country Songs) chart in June and July of that year. In 1996, the song received the Robert J. Burton award from Broadcast Music Incorporated for being the most-performed country song of the year.

Content
It is an up-tempo song in which the narrator states that, no matter how he is feeling on a particular day, he feels better once his lover winks at him.

Music video
The music video was directed by Martin Kahan and premiered in mid-1994. It shows McCoy performing the song at an event, as well as trying to get his lover to wink, which she refuses.

Chart positions
"Wink" debuted at number 59 on the U.S. Billboard Hot Country Singles & Tracks for the week of April 23, 1994.

Year-end charts

References

1994 singles
Neal McCoy songs
Songs written by Tom Shapiro
Songs written by Bob DiPiero
Song recordings produced by Barry Beckett
Atlantic Records singles
1994 songs